The 2007 U.S. Men's Clay Court Championships was a men's tennis event that was part of the ATP International Series category of the 2007 ATP Tour. It was the 39th edition of the tournament and was played on outdoor clay courts at the River Oaks Country Club in Houston, Texas, in the United States. Unseeded Ivo Karlović won the singles title and Bob and Mike Bryan won in doubles.

Finals

Singles

 Ivo Karlović defeated  Mariano Zabaleta, 6–4, 6–1

Doubles

 Bob Bryan /  Mike Bryan defeated  Mark Knowles /  Daniel Nestor, 7–6(7–3), 6–4

References

External links
 Association of Tennis Professionals (ATP) tournament profile

 
U.S. Men's Clay Court Championships
U.S. Men's Clay Court Championships
U.S. Men's Clay Court Championships
U.S. Men's Clay Court Championships